Tindivanam K. Ramamurthy (British Raj, 5 April 1934 – 8 August 2021) was an Indian politician from Tamil Nadu. He was a member of the Indian National Congress and served as the Secretary/General Secretary of Tamil Nadu P.C.C. (1967–78). He was a member of the Tamil Nadu Legislative Assembly (1967–71) and Tamil Nadu Legislative Council (1976-84) where he was the Leader of the Opposition (1981–84). He was a nominated member of the Rajya Sabha from 1984 to 1990.

Death
K. Ramamurthy died at Chennai on 8 August 2021 due to age-related illness.

Sources
Brief Biodata

1934 births
2021 deaths
Indian National Congress politicians from Tamil Nadu
Nominated members of the Rajya Sabha
Members of the Tamil Nadu Legislative Assembly
People from Tamil Nadu